Gareth Costa (born 23 November 1964) is a South African rower. He competed in the men's lightweight coxless four event at the 1996 Summer Olympics.

References

External links
 

1964 births
Living people
South African male rowers
Olympic rowers of South Africa
Rowers at the 1996 Summer Olympics
Rowers from Johannesburg